Penn State Brandywine is a commonwealth campus of the Pennsylvania State University located in Middletown Township, Pennsylvania. The campus was formerly known as Penn State Delaware County. The campus has baccalaureate and associate degrees and certificate programs. In August 2017, the campus established on-campus housing for the first time with the opening of Orchard Hall, a 250-bed dormitory.

Athletics

Penn State University Community College (PSUCC)- Brandywine Campus teams participate as a member of the United States Collegiate Athletic Association (USCAA). The Nittany Lions are a member of the Pennsylvania State University Athletic Conference (PSUAC). Men's sports include baseball, basketball, cross country, golf, soccer, tennis, and track and field; while women's sports include basketball, cross country, tennis, soccer, softball, volleyball, and track and field.

References

External links

 Official website

Educational institutions established in 1967
Universities and colleges in Delaware County, Pennsylvania
Middletown Township, Delaware County, Pennsylvania
Brandywine